Manuelito is a census-designated place (CDP) on the Navajo Nation in McKinley County, New Mexico, United States. It was first listed as a CDP prior to the 2020 census.

Demographics

Description
New Mexico State Road 118 (Historic Route 66) and Interstate 40 pass through the community. The closest I-40 access is from Exit 8 (NM 118),  to the northeast.

Education
The community is within the Gallup-McKinley County Public Schools.

Zoned schools are: Tobe Turpen Elementary School, Chief Manualito Middle School, and Gallup High School.

See also

 List of census-designated places in New Mexico

References

External links

Census-designated places in McKinley County, New Mexico
Census-designated places in New Mexico
Navajo Nation